Herbert Wilk (1905–1977) was a German stage, television and film actor. He emerged as a screen actor during the Nazi era, appearing in war films such as U-Boote westwärts (1941). However the bulk of his career came after the Second World War. After initially appearing in films made by the East German studio DEFA, he largely worked in West German television for the remainder of his career.

Selected filmography
 The Desert Song (1939)
 Commissioner Eyck (1940)
 The Rothschilds (1940)
 U-Boote westwärts (1941)
 Stukas (1941)
 Free Land (1946)
 The Beaver Coat (1949)
 The Girl from the South Seas (1950)
 Canaris (1954)
 The Mosquito (1954)
 Stresemann (1957)
 The Black Chapel (1959)
 Blind Justice (1961)

References

External links

Bibliography
 Kreimeier, Klaus. The Ufa Story: A History of Germany's Greatest Film Company, 1918-1945. University of California Press, 1999.

1905 births
1977 deaths
People from Rostock (district)
People from the Grand Duchy of Mecklenburg-Schwerin
German male television actors
German male stage actors
German male film actors
20th-century German male actors